Vikramgarh Alot railway station is a small railway station in Ratlam district, Madhya Pradesh. Its code is VMA. It serves Alot city. The station consists of two platforms.

Major trains
Bandra SVDK express 
HAPA SVDK express 
 Bandra Terminus–Gorakhpur Avadh Express
 Bandra Terminus–Dehradun Express
 Bandra Terminus–Muzaffarpur Avadh Express
 Jaipur Superfast Express
 Firozpur Janata Express
 Coimbatore–Jaipur Superfast Express
 Jaipur–Mysore Superfast Express
 Chennai Central–Jaipur Superfast Express
 Ranthambore Express
 Indore–New Delhi Intercity Express
 Puri–Jodhpur Express
 Ratlam–Mathura Passenger
 Phulera–Ratlam Fast Passenger
 Kota–Vadodara Passenger
 Ratlam–Kota Passenger

References

Railway stations in Ratlam district
Kota railway division